The Fliegerfaust (lit. "pilot fist","plane fist", or "aviator fist"), also known as the "Luftfaust" (lit. "air fist"), was a German prototype of an unguided, man-portable, multi-barreled ground-to-air rocket launcher, designed to destroy enemy ground attack planes.

Overview 
Designed by HASAG (Hugo Schneider AG) of Leipzig in 1944, the Luftfaust was produced in two different versions.

The first version, the Fliegerfaust A, had four 20mm barrels. These fired 20mm projectiles weighing 90g and containing 19g of explosive, propelled by a small rocket.

The second version, the Fliegerfaust B, added another 5 barrels (for a total of 9 barrels), and increased the barrels' length. The weapon therefore had a total length of 150cm and weighed 6.5kg. During the firing sequence the first 4 rounds from every other barrel were fired immediately, while the other five fired with a 0.1 second delay. The delay was meant to prevent the projectiles from getting damaged by the previous launches' exhaust fumes, which could also interfere with their courses. Some sources, however, state that the barrels were fired individually with a delay of 2 seconds between each ignition.

Stabilization of the rocket during flight was achieved by four small angled holes drilled around the exhaust. A small proportion of the rocket's thrust was thus converted into rotational thrust, spinning the missile along its axis. This imparted stability through spin, like rifling in a gun barrel.

A six barrel 30 mm prototype was also constructed.

Combat use 
The Fliegerfaust was not a successful weapon because of its small effective range. The dispersion of its projectiles proved to be too large, and the anticipated range of 500 meters was never attained. Although 10,000 launchers and 4 million rockets were ordered in 1945, only 80 of these weapons were ever used in combat trials by a unit based at Saarbrücken.
However, a 1945 photograph of the Hotel Adlon, directly opposite the Brandenburg gate in Berlin, clearly shows at least 3 expended Fliegerfaust B's lying in the rubble.

References 

 
 

Surface-to-air missiles of Germany
World War II infantry weapons of Germany
Weapons and ammunition introduced in 1945